Goalpariya people are a group of people native to Goalpara region of Assam, India. They speak Kamtapuri, Assamese, Bodo, Rabha etc.

Notable people 

 Amrit Bhushan Dev Adhikari
 Pratima Barua Pandey
 Adil Hussain

References 

Goalpara region